The following is a list of all IFT-licensed over-the-air television stations broadcasting in Mexico City. There are 18 television stations in Mexico City. Mexico City is home to the flagship stations for all major networks.

List of television stations

|-

|-

|-

|-

|-

|-

|-

|-

|-

|-

|-

|-

|-

|-

|-

|-

Defunct stations
 XHTRES-TDT 27 (virtual 10, formerly 28), 1999–2022

Notes

References

Ciudad de Mexico